Donald J. Sanborn (born February 19, 1950) is an American sedevacantist bishop, known for his advocacy of sedevacantism and sedeprivationism. He currently serves as the Superior General of the sedevacantist Roman Catholic Institute (RCI) and rector of the sedevacantist Most Holy Trinity Seminary which was relocated to Reading, Pennsylvania, United States in Fall 2022.

Biography

Early years

Donald Sanborn was born into a Roman Catholic family in Flushing, Queens, New York, United States. There, he attended Catholic elementary and high schools. In 1967, he entered the seminary college for the Diocese of Brooklyn, where, in 1971, he graduated cum laude, having majored in classical languages.

Priesthood

Society of Saint Pius X

In the same year, Sanborn dropped out of the Seminary of the Immaculate Conception, whose training he considered modernist, and entered the International Seminary of Saint Pius X, Écône, Switzerland, of the traditionalist Society of Saint Pius X (SSPX), becoming one of first seminarians of the newly founded society.

On 29 June 1975, in Écône, he was ordained a priest by Archbishop Marcel Lefebvre of the SSPX. Canonical recognition of the SSPX had been withdrawn by the local Roman Catholic bishop in May 1975, one month prior to his ordination, and this move would later be upheld by the Holy See.

By 1976, Sanborn was offering the traditional Latin Mass for Catholics on Long Island, New York, United States, together with Clarence Kelly.

Saint Thomas Aquinas Seminary

In 1977, Sanborn was teaching at a seminary of the SSPX which was then called Saint Joseph's House of Studies, in Armada, Michigan, United States. Later in the same year, he was appointed Rector of the Seminary.

Leaving the Society of Saint Pius X, co-founding the Society of Saint Pius V

Lefebvre directed the SSPX's American priests to follow the 1962 liturgical books. Sanborn and eight other American priests refused to do these. These nine priests accused Lefebvre of being insufficiently traditionalist. According to Sanborn, Lefebvre was imposing these liturgical and disciplinary changes in view of a reconciliation with the Vatican.

On April 27, 1983, these nine priests, along with some seminarians who were sympathetic to them, were promptly expelled from the SSPX by Lefebvre, for their refusal to use the 1962 Missal and for other reasons, such as their resistance to Lefebvre's order that priests of the SSPX must accept the decrees of nullity handed down by diocesan marriage tribunals, and their disapproval of the SSPX's policy of accepting into the society new members who had been ordained to the priesthood according to the revised sacramental rites of Paul VI. Almost immediately, these nine priests formed the Society of Saint Pius V (SSPV).

Leaving the Society of Saint Pius V 
In 1984, Sanborn established the independent Blessed Sacrament Chapel in Martinez, California, United States. In 1991, Sanborn left the SSPV.

Most Holy Trinity Seminary

In 1995, Sanborn founded the sedevacantist Most Holy Trinity Seminary in Spring Lake, Florida, United States. Prior to his episcopal consecration later in 2002, the seminary's graduates were ordained by Dolan, who was consecrated a bishop in 1993. In 2005, the seminary was relocated to Brooksville, Florida.

Episcopacy

Episcopal consecration 
On June 19, 2002, in Detroit, Michigan, Sanborn was consecrated a bishop by the American sedeprivationist bishop Robert McKenna of the Orthodox Roman Catholic Movement.

Sanborn served as pastor of the Queen of All Saints Chapel in Brooksville, Florida.

Episcopal consecration of Selway 

On February 22, 2018, Sanborn consecrated his intended successor, Joseph Selway, as a bishop, with Bishop Geert Stuyver of the Istituto Mater Boni Consilii (Verrua Savoia, Turin, Italy) and Bishop Daniel Dolan (from West Chester, Ohio) assisting as co-consecrators.

Present day 
Sanborn currently serves as the Superior General of the Roman Catholic Institute and as the rector of the Most Holy Trinity Seminary which was relocated from Brooksville, Florida to Reading, Pennsylvania in Fall 2022. He currently offers private Masses only at Most Holy Trinity Seminary.

He frequently visits Mass centers in the United States and occasionally travels to Europe, meeting with sedevacantist clergy and laity.

He is fluent in Latin, French, and Italian, and has a working knowledge of Greek, German and Spanish.

References

External links

 Personal blog

Traditionalist Catholic bishops
People from New York (state)
1950 births
Living people
People from Brooksville, Florida
People from Macomb County, Michigan
Thục line bishops
American traditionalist Catholics
Sedevacantists
Sedeprivationists
Former members of the Society of Saint Pius X